Soul in a Hole is an at home concert video by Mortiis. It was recorded in London at the Hackney Ocean during the Unlimited Grudge Tour in September 2004. A limited set of 300 came with a poster; These were only available when pre-ordered from the official Mortiis site.

Track listing
Live Video:
"Intro"
"Broken Skin"
"Way Too Wicked"
"Marshland"
"The Worst in Me"
"Monolith"
"Gibber"
"Decadent & Desperate"
"Parasite God"
"The Loneliest Thing"
"Asthma"
"The Grudge"
"Smell the Witch"
"Mental Maelstrom"
"Le Petit Cochon Sordide"

Video tracks:
"Parasite God"
"Mental Maelstrom (implode)"
"The Grudge"
"Decadent & Desperate (absentia)"

Bonus material:
"Mortiis Interview"
"'The Grudge' TV advert"
"'The Grudge' EPK"
"Picture Gallery"

Miscellaneous
 The uncensored version of the Decadent & Desperate video could be accessed by going to the Video's menu, highlighting 'Menu' and pressing left twice. Or alternatively by clicking the Mortiis logo on the left hand side with a mouse.
 The song 'Monolith' was replaced with 'Underdog' for the 'Soul in a Hole 2005' promotional tour.
 The real name to 'Intro' is 'I Die in My Dreams'.

References

External links
 Official website
 The Big Machine - Fansite

Mortiis albums
2005 video albums
Live video albums
2005 live albums